Sorapagus is a monotypic genus of bush crickets in the tribe Ephippigerini, erected by Barat in 2012.  The single species had long been placed in the genus Steropleurus.

Species 
The Orthoptera Species File only includes Sorapagus catalaunicus (Bolívar, 1898) in this genus.  It is  endemic to Pyrénées and sometimes called the Catalan saddle bush-cricket.

References

External links 
 Atlas of Catalan Orthoptera (in Spanish)
 

Orthoptera of Europe
Ensifera genera
Bradyporinae
Monotypic Orthoptera genera